Amazone was a  of the French Navy. The boat was launched on 28 December 1931. Amazone was decommissioned on 26 April 1946.

See also

List of submarines of France

References 

World War II submarines of France
1931 ships
Diane-class submarine (1930)